Federation of Services is the name of:

 Federation of Services (France), a trade union in France
 Federation of Services (Spain), a trade union in Spain